Wilderville may refer to:
Wilderville, Oregon, an unincorporated community in Josephine County, Oregon
Wilderville, Texas, an unincorporated community in Falls County, Texas